Yonkers Middle High School is located in Yonkers, New York, United States. The school offers the International Baccalaureate program.

Yonkers High School was ranked the 24th best American high school and the 4th best New York State high school in 2012 by U.S. News & World Report. Yonkers High School offers Advanced Placement courses and participates in the International Baccalaureate program. In line with the IB program, Yonkers High School aims to create a "community of caring learners" by encouraging community service activity among its students. Students at Yonkers High School can graduate with a standard diploma, Regents Diploma, or Advanced Designation. Extracurricular opportunities for students include clubs such as Habitat for Humanity and the Bio-Diversity Club.

Alumni include the actor and comic Sid Caesar and John Howard Northrop, recipient of the 1946 Nobel Prize in Chemistry.

References

External links
 Yonkers High School homepage

Public high schools in Yonkers, New York
Public schools in Yonkers, New York
Public middle schools in Westchester County, New York
International Baccalaureate schools in New York (state)